Erkki Aadli (born 26 March 1974) is an Estonian orienteer.

Education
Aadli graduated from Saue Gymnasium in 1992. He graduated from the Tallinn University of Technology in 1997 with a degree in construction.

Work
Aadli works as a project manager for the constructor company Parmeron AS.

Sports career
From 1996 to 2014 Aadli won eight gold medals, nine silver medals, and eight bronze medals at the Estonian Orienteering Championship for Foot orienteering.

References

External links
 

Estonian orienteers
Tallinn University of Technology alumni
1974 births
Living people